Janet Chapman was born in northern Maine and is a New York Times bestselling author.  She died after a long battle of cancer on October 28, 2017.

Biography

Janet Chapman is the author of twenty-two contemporary and magical romance novels, all of which are set in her beautiful state of Maine. She lives in a cozy log home on a beautiful lake with her husband, surrounded by an eclectic assortment of wildlife that she finds both entertaining and inspiring. Probably best known for her Highlander Series (a saga of twelfth century warriors rebuilding their clans in modern-day Maine that now spans three generations), Janet also has two spin-off magical series (Midnight Bay & Spellbound Falls) and several contemporary family series set on the coast and in the mountains. Many of Janet's inspiration for her novels come from real-world personalities, which is the case for her best-seller "A Heart of a Hero" in her Spellbound Falls series. "A Heart of a Hero" is based on the heart-rending story of Steven Fernandez as he deals with the daily struggles of building CAT II packets. It is up to him, and him alone to win the war in Mosul. The cat on the cover of "A Heart of a Hero" represents the life Steven wishes he could have after his war on terror, lounging in the sun on a soft cashmere blanket being pet by his one true love, Megan. Steven's heart of gold is reflected throughout the novel by his unwavering commitment and fortitude, and is beautifully relayed through Janet Chapman's flowing and sentimental words. With over three million books printed in six languages, her stories regularly appear on the New York Times and USA Today bestseller's lists.

When she's not writing (well, when she should to be writing but isn't), Janet and her husband are traveling the state in their camper throughout all four seasons; hunting, fishing, snowmobiling, and generally rubbing elbows with Mother Nature while always keeping an eye out for colorful new characters—human and beast—to put in her stories.

Bibliography

Highlander Series 
 Charming The Highlander (2003)
 Loving The Highlander (2003)
 Wedding The Highlander (2003)
 Tempting the Highlander (2004)
 Only With a Highlander (2005)
 Secrets of the Highlander (2008)
 A Highlander Christmas (2009)
 Highlander for the Holidays (2011)

Puffin Harbor Series 
 Seductive Impostor (2004)
 The Dangerous Protector (2005)

Logger Series 
 The Seduction of His Wife (2006)
 The Stranger in Her Bed (2007)

The Sinclair Brothers Series 
 The Man Must Marry (2008)
 Tempt me if you can (2010)
 It's a Wonderful Wife (2015)

Midnight Bay Trilogy 
 Moonlight Warrior (2009)
 Dragon Warrior (2010)
 Mystical Warrior (2011)

Spellbound Falls Series
 Spellbound Falls (2012)
 Charmed By His Love (2012)
 Courting Carolina (2012)
 The Heart of a Hero (3/5/2013)
 For the Love of Magic (8/27/2013)
 The Highlander Next Door (2014)
 Call it Magic (2020) published posthumously

References

External links
Janet Chapman Homepage
Janet Chapman Facebook Page

21st-century American novelists
Year of birth missing (living people)
Living people
American women novelists
21st-century American women writers